The World RX of France is a Rallycross event held in France for the FIA World Rallycross Championship. The event made its debut in the 2014 season, at the Circuit de Lohéac in the town of Lohéac, Bretagne.

In 2019, the event change his name into Bretagne World RX of France.

In 2021, the event change his name again, becoming Bretagne World RX of Lohéac.

Past winners

References

External links

France
Auto races in France